The Minister of State for Schools, formerly the Minister of State for School Standards and Parliamentary Under-Secretary of State for School Standards, is a mid-level position in the Department for Education in the British government.

The current minister is Nick Gibb.

History 
In the Major ministries, the role was known as Minister of State for Education and Science and Minister of State for Education.

In the Brown ministry (2007 to 2010), the Minister of State for Schools and Learning worked at the Department for Children, Schools and Families.

In the Cameron ministries, the role was known as Minster of State for Schools.

Responsibilities 
The minister is responsible for the following:

 recruitment and retention of teachers and school leaders (including initial teacher training, qualifications and professional development)
 supporting a high-quality teaching profession and reducing teacher workload
 Teaching Regulation Agency
 admissions and school transport
 school revenue funding, including the national funding formula for schools
 curriculum and qualifications (including links with Ofqual)
 Standards and Testing Agency and primary assessment
 school accountability and inspection (including links with Ofsted)
 support for raising school standards
 school sport
 pupil premium
 relationships, sex, and health education; and personal, social, health and economic education
 behaviour and attendance and exclusions
 early education curriculum and teaching quality
 coronavirus (COVID-19) response for schools

List of Ministers

References 

Education in England
Department for Education
Lists of government ministers of the United Kingdom
Education ministers of the United Kingdom